Monochamus irrorator is a species of beetle in the family Cerambycidae. It was described by Chevrolat in 1855, originally spelled as "Monohammus" irrorator. It is known from the Republic of the Congo and Nigeria.

Subspecies
 Monochamus irrorator cineraceus (Jordan, 1894)
 Monochamus irrorator irrorator (Chevrolat, 1855)

References

inexpectatus
Beetles described in 1855